T. roseum may refer to:
 Trichonema roseum, a synonym for Romulea rosea, a herbaceous perennial species
 Trichothecium roseum, a plant pathogen species

See also
 Roseum (disambiguation)